The 1999 Hall of Fame Tennis Championships, also known as Miller Lite Hall of Fame Championships for sponsorship reasons, was a men's tennis tournament played on grass courts at the International Tennis Hall of Fame in Newport, Rhode Island in the United States and was part of the World Series of the 1999 ATP Tour. It was the 24th edition of the tournament and was held from July 5 through July 11, 1999. Unseeded Chris Woodruff won the singles title.

Finals

Singles

 Chris Woodruff defeated  Kenneth Carlsen 6–7(5–7), 6–4, 6–4
 It was Woodruff's only singles title of the year and the 2nd, and last, of his career.

Doubles

 Wayne Arthurs /  Leander Paes defeated  Sargis Sargsian /  Chris Woodruff 6–7(6–8), 7–6(9–7), 6–3

References

External links
 Official website
 ATP tournament profile
 ITF tournament edition details

 
Hall of Fame Tennis Championships
Hall of Fame Tennis Championships
Hall of Fame Tennis Championships
Hall of Fame Tennis Championships
Hall of Fame Open